Rahimabad Seh (also Romanized as Rahīmābād Seh, meaning "Rahimabad 3"; also known as Raḩīmī and Rahīmābād) is a village in Dowreh Rural District, Chegeni District, Dowreh County, Lorestan Province, Iran. At the 2006 census, its population was 51 persons in 16 families.

References 

Towns and villages in Dowreh County